Vusimuzi Balindile Khoza  (born June 18, 2008), known professionally as Lil Vivo G, is an South African rapper. He rose to prominence with his singles "Don't Reminisce"[1] and "Anxiety" (featuring Young Ski).

Early life 

Vusimuzi Balindile Khoza was born on June 18, 2008, and raised in Soweto, Snake Park of  Johannesburg, Soweto.He is the first of two children, having an young sister, her name is Thandolwethu Sibahle Khoza.[10]He grew up with his cousin on a small house/shack.Lil Vivo G started making music when he was like 8 years after his father's death.He use to freestyle after school or school hours.When he getting to be serious about making music, he influenced his homies Owam, Musa, Gift and Ayanda.Owam goes by the stage name Young Ski, Musa goes by the stage name Young Choppa, Gift goes by the stage name Young Gift and Ayanda goes by the stage name Lil Kid G.Vusimuzi Balindile Khoza his mother's name is Fortune Khoza.Lil Vivo G home situation ain't good that why he hustle every single day.

Professional career 

Alexander is considered best known for his lead roles that he has performed on the Australian stage. Some of his well-known roles are Bobby Strong in Melbourne Theatre Company's Urinetown, Claude in Hair, Willard in Footloose, Billy Crocker in Anything Goes, and the Scarecrow in the Sydney season of The Wizard Of Oz. He has also appeared in the 10th-anniversary production of Les Misérables, South Pacific, Only Heaven Knows and Angry Penguins.

Alexander has also toured Australia in concert with the Australian Philharmonic Orchestra.

It was in 2000 that Kane took his cabaret show to New York. There he appeared at the FireBird Cafe and Algonquin Hotel's Oak Room. In the 2001 New York Cabaret Awards, he was named "Best New Voice" in the Theatermania Cabaret list, and won both the BISTRO and MAC Awards for "Most Outstanding Debut". Furthermore, he became "Critic's Pick" in the New York Post, and "Pick of the Week" in New York's Time Out Magazine for three consecutive weeks. Then in 2002, he was requested to perform alongside Natalie Cole at Rupert Murdoch's 70th birthday party, hosted in New York.

After his return to Australia, he was named a finalist in the Arts section of the 2001 Young Australian of the Year Awards, and nominated for a MO Award for his performance in Footloose. Kane also completed a tour with the Australian Philharmonic Orchestra, performing The Music of Lerner & Loewe at concert halls around Australia.

Alexander has also made several television appearances, such as Good Morning Australia, Denise, The Midday Show, In Melbourne Tonight, Carols By Candlelight and The Good Friday Appeal Gala, along with roles in Late For School, Neighbours, Water Rats and Stingers. He also appeared as a guest performer on the 18 June 2006 special broadcast of The Footy Show which was filmed in Munich in which he performed the song "Timeless" with Australian icon Tina Arena. The show was specially broadcast in support of the Australian soccer team for the 2006 world cup.

Kane Alexander (debut album) 

The concept for the album emerged from Kane's passion for pop, opera, and the sweeping orchestration of the most memorable movie themes.

"I wanted to make an album that moved people, with songs that told a story. I wanted to take the listener on a journey. But I wanted a cinematic sound. I wanted the orchestra to be scored the way a film score would be scored. This had to be an album that I wanted to listen to myself."

According to his Myspace page, Alexander has stated that he was happy that Sony BMG allowed him to spend three years capturing his vision for the album. This allowed him to get the right producer and sound for the record. The debut album was recorded in Stockholm and London, with the efforts of producers and songwriters such as Andes Bagge, Quiz & Larossi, Tom Nichols, Tim Baxter, and Sigurd Rosnes as well as members of the Stockholm Symphony Orchestra (who appear on every track).

Come Vivrei is an enchanting Italian adaption of Trisha Yearwood's Grammy award-winning song, "How Do I Live", whereas other classics included are the poetic "Kiss From A Rose" by Seal, and "Crying" by Roy Orbison, both reworked into baritone adaptions from their original versions. Much loved classics "Le Cose Che Sei Per Me", "Di Sole E D'Azzuro" and "Nella Fantasia" are also included. This album also contains the origin of the Tina Arena duet, with a studio version of the song "Timeless" that they subsequently performed for The Footy Show.

Alexander professes that he never saw himself as a writer, yet contributed his songwriting talents to co-writing two songs on the album, opener "Escape" and epilogue "Breathe". These were co-written with Andes Bagge and Tom Nichols.

 "Escape"
 "Come Vivrei (How Do I Live)"
 "Timeless" (Duet with Tina Arena)
 "Di Sole E D'Azzuro"
 "Nella Fantasia"
 "Everything That I am"
 "Le Cose Che Sei Per Me (The Things You Are To Me)"
 "Crying"
 "Kiss from a Rose"
 "Let It Rain"
 "Breathe"

References

External links / References 
 
 http://www.icmi.com.au/kane-alexander
 https://web.archive.org/web/20081217075021/http://profile.myspace.com/index.cfm?fuseaction=user.viewprofile
 http://www.allegromusic.com.au/index.php?option=directory&task=profile&lid=117

Living people
Year of birth missing (living people)
Australian male television actors